Fair Park station is a DART Light Rail station located in Fair Park in Dallas, Texas. The station opened on September 14, 2009 as one of four original stops on the line. Fair Park contains the largest collection of Art Deco exhibition buildings in the world, built for the 1936 Texas Centennial Exposition. The station was designed to blend into the surrounding architecture while revitalizing the historic entrance into Fair Park.

During important events during the State Fair of Texas, Fair Park station is served by "special event" trains from the Red Line and Blue Line.

References

External links 
Dallas Area Rapid Transit - Fair Park Station

Dallas Area Rapid Transit light rail stations in Dallas
Railway stations in the United States opened in 2009
2009 establishments in Texas
Art Deco architecture in Texas
Fair Park
Railway stations in Dallas County, Texas